Manzel was an American instrumental funk band from Lexington, Kentucky, which formed in 1973 and disbanded in 1978. They consisted of Manzel Bush (keyboards), John Larry Van Dyke (guitar) and Steve Garner (drums). In 1976, they recorded some sessions at Counterpart Creative Studios in Cincinnati, Ohio, which resulted in the songs "Space Funk", "Jump Street", "Midnight Theme" and "Sugar Dreams". The first two were released in 1977, and the latter two were released in 1979. While very obscure, Manzel have been widely sampled by hip hop musicians, including De La Soul, Cypress Hill, Ghostface Killah, Eric B. & Rakim and Ultramagnetic MCs. "Space Funk" was also sampled by Grandmaster Flash in the late 1970s.

Discography
Singles
1977 – "Space Funk"/"Jump Street"
1979 – "Sugar Dreams"/"Midnight Theme"
2017 - "High and Tight"/"Standing On Mars"

References

External links 
 Manzel biography at AllMusic
 Manzel discography at Discogs

American funk musical groups
Musical groups established in 1973
Musical groups disestablished in 1978